Wipperfelder Bach  is a river of North Rhine-Westphalia, Germany. It is an orographic right tributary of the Kürtener Sülz.

Topography
From here, the creek flows south.

Ecosystem
One of the native animals of the river is the Brown Trout.

See also
List of rivers of North Rhine-Westphalia

References

Rivers of North Rhine-Westphalia
Rivers of Germany